Eyliac is a former commune in the Dordogne department in Nouvelle-Aquitaine in southwestern France. On 1 January 2017, it was merged into the new commune Bassillac et Auberoche.

Population

See also
Château d'Eyliac
Communes of the Dordogne department
Château de la Chalupie

References

Former communes of Dordogne